Shyamal Kumar Sen (born 25 November 1940) is an Indian jurist who served as a chief justice of the Allahabad High Court and also as a Governor of West Bengal. He was appointed governor in May 1999 following the resignation of A R Kidwai and served from May 1999 to December 1999.

Early life
After graduating from the Scottish Church College, he studied law at the University of Calcutta.

Career
He had worked as a lecturer in the commercial and industrial laws in the City College, Kolkata (under the University of Calcutta) from 1964 to 1971, as well as in the faculty of law at the University of Calcutta from 1971 to 1985. He was elevated as a permanent judge of the Calcutta High Court in February 1986. He served as chief justice of the Allahabad High Court on 18 July 2000.

He served as the Governor of West Bengal from May to December 1999.

References

Living people
Chief Justices of the Allahabad High Court
Judges of the Calcutta High Court
Governors of West Bengal
1940 births
Bengali Hindus
Politicians from Kolkata
Scottish Church College alumni
University of Calcutta alumni
Academic staff of the University of Calcutta
20th-century Indian judges